Kamaldeep Singh Dhaliwal (born 19 July 1977), commonly known as Hobby Dhaliwal is an Indian film actor, singer, and politician. He is known for his works in Punjabi and Hindi films.  Dhaliwal began his career by debut movie Burrraahh in 2012. The films Angrej (2015), Lahoriye (2017), Jora 10 Numbaria (2017), and Ardaas Karaan (2019) are among his best known works.

Early life and education 
Hobby was born on19 July 1977 in Sangrur, Punjab, India. He attended the government school in Patiala and graduated from the Government Mohindra College in Patiala, Punjab. In addition to having a brother named Sukhwant Singh Dhaliwal, Hobby was born to Balvir Singh Dhaliwal and Surinder Kaur. The fashion designer Lilli Dhaliwal and Hobby Dhaliwal wed in 1989 and two kids were born to the couple.

Career

Music career 
During college events, Dhaliwal was recognized by Punjabi singer Pammi Bai, who later performed alongside him on stages. Hobby Dhaliwal, as a singer, has three studio albums: Mar Jangeero Geda, Sade pind na Avi, and Jatt Warga Yaar ni Thiona before entering in Punjabi cinema.

Acting career 
He is best known for the films Ardaas Karaan, Jora 10 Numbaria, Lahoriye, Angrej, Bambukat and Lahoriye but also appeared in the number of films, and web series.

Filmography 

 Burrraahh (2012) as Sidhu
 Fer Mamla Gadbad Gadbad (2013) as Sarpanch
 Heer & Hero (2013) as Sweety's dad
 Mundeyan Ton Bachke Rahin (2014) as Mr. Sandhu
 Punjabian Da King (2015) as Balraj Singh
 Angrej (2015) as Gajjan Singh (Dhann Kaur's father)
 Shareek (2015) as Nachattar
 Shareek 2 (2016) as Pakko's father
 25 Kille (2016) as Santokh Singh
 Phillauri (2017) as Kanan's father
 Manje Bistre (2017) as 
 Arjan (2017) as Sarpanch
 Lahoriye (2017) as Chaudhary- Neseem's father
 Saab Bahadar (2017) as Ruldu Sarpanch
 Krazzy Tabbar (2017) as Dhaliwal
 Thug Life (2017) as Chief Minister
 Jora 10 Numbaria (2017) as eja Aulakh
 Bailaras (2017) as 
 Dangar Doctor Jelly (2017) as DSP Kabul Singh 
 Laung Laachi (2018) as Ajaypal's father
 Carry on Jatta 2 (2018) as Mr. Sandhu- Meet's Uncle
 Jatt vs. Ielts (2018) as 
 Ashke (2018) as Dhaliwal- Bhangra Coach
 Mar Gaye Oye Loko (2018) as 
 Kurmaiyan (2018) as Ajaib Singh- Paali's dad
 Parahuna (2018) as Jantaa's father
 Namaste England (2018) as Param's Bauji
 Rang Panjab (2018) as 
 Bhajjo Veero Ve (2018) as Surmeet's father
 Titanic (2018) as 
 Desi (2019) as 
 High End Yaariyaan (2019) as Nachhatar Singh
 Munda Faridkotia (2019) as Malik
 Yaara Ve (2019) as 
 Nadhoo Khan (2019) as Poorna
 Lukan Michi (2019) as Sardaara
 15 Lakh Kado Aauga (2019) as 
 Punj Khaab (2019) as 
 Ardaas Karaan (2019) as Sohan- Sehaj's father
 Ashke 2 (2019) as 
 Khandaani Shafakhana (2019) as Pradhaan
 Jaddi Sardar (2019) as Shamsher Shera
 Doorbeen (2019) as DSP Satrang Singh
 Daaka (2019) as Sukhchain
 Easy Money (2019) as Short
 Mool Mantar (2019) as 
 Jinde Meriye (2020) as Dilaawar
 Ik Sandhu Hunda Si (2020) as Sandhu's Father
 Happy Happy Ho Gaya (2021) as 
 Fauji Band (2021) as 
 Teri Meri Nahi Nibhni (2021) as 
 Range (2021) as 
 Ucha Pind (2021) as Shamsher Singh
 Thana Sadar (2021) as 
 Fuffad Ji (2021) as Sardara
 Prindey (2022) as 
 Mera Vyah Kara Do (2022) as 
 Bajre Da Sitta (2022) as 
 Baraat Bandi (2022) as 
 S.H.O. Sher Singh (2022) as
 Shikaari 2 (2022) as 
 Sayonee (TBA) as 
 Victor (TBA) as Madhulal
 Mukkaddar (TBA) as 
' 'IB71' ' (TBA) as

Political career 
On 7 February 2022, in Chandigarh, Hobby Dhaliwal formally joined the Bharatiya Janata Party (BJP) in the presence of Manohar Lal Khattar, the Chief Minister of Haryana, and Gajendra Singh Shekhawat, a Union minister and the BJP's regional director for Punjab. Khattar welcomed the actor to the party and declared, "With well-known artists like Dhaliwal selecting the BJP, the party will further strengthen in Punjab. Due to their dissatisfaction with other political parties, more of these people are joining the saffron party.

References

External links 

 

Actors from Punjab, India
Living people
Punjabi people
Indian film actors
Indian television actors
20th-century Indian actors
21st-century Indian actors
1977 births